Lapidus (including its variant spellings) is:

 a surname which derived from the Latin word lapideus, meaning 'made of stone'; 'stony', also from the Latin lapis meaning 'stone'. It could also be derived from the Latin adjective lepidus meaning pleasant or charming. A branch of the Roman gens Aemilia was cognominated Lepidus. Marcus Aemilius Lepidus was a member of the Second Triumvirate, with Octavius (later Caesar Augustus) and Marcus Antonius. 

 a surname which perhaps has a Bible origin and going back to the book of Judges 4,4: "Now Deborah, a prophetess, the wife of Lapidoth, was judging Israel at that time", and hence probably derived from lapidot, the Hebrew word for torches, yet is not exclusive to one religion or nationality.

People
Adam I. Lapidus (born 1963), American television writer
Azary Lapidus (born 1958), Russian civil engineer
Ira M. Lapidus (born 1937), American historian, author and educator
Jens Lapidus (born 1974), Swedish lawyer and author
Jay Lapidus (born 1959), American tennis player
Jodi Lapidus, American biostatistician
Leon Lapidus (1924–1977), American chemist
Mark Lapidus (born 1995), Estonian chess player
Morris Lapidus (1902–2001), American architect
Ted Lapidus (1929–2008), French fashion designer

In popular culture
There is a character named Frank Lapidus, a pilot played by Jeff Fahey, on the ABC television show Lost.

There is also a character named Merc Lapidus, a producer played by John Pankow, on the television show Episodes.

There is a third character named Leslie Lapidus, a nymphomaniac character, from the book and film Sophie's Choice.
Howie Mandel played the character of Ernie Lapidus, operator of "Sincerity Mortuary" in the superlative but short lived Fox Sitcom "Good Grief" in the late 1980s, co-starring the Uber-beautiful Wendy Schaal

References

Surnames